Sabah Electricity Sdn. Bhd. (abbrev. SESB) is Sabah electrical company that generates, transmits and distributes electricity mainly in the state of Sabah and the Federal Territory of Labuan. It supplies electrical power to 413,983 customers distributed over a wide area of 74,000 km2. 82.8% of the customers are domestic customers consuming only 28.8% of the power generated. This company employs more than 2,300 employees and the main stakeholders of this company are Tenaga Nasional Berhad (TNB) (80%) and Government of Sabah (20%).

History
Electricity started in Sabah as early as 1910 supplied by 3 separate organisations. In 1957 these three organisations combined to form North Borneo Electricity Board. Upon the formation of Malaysia in 1963, it was renamed Sabah Electricity Board. On 1 September 1998, Sabah Electricity Board was privatised and became Sabah Electricity Sdn. Bhd.

Generation capacity
The total generation capacity of SESB is 866.4 MW, 50.3% of the total units generated are purchased from the independent power producers (IPP).

The SESB installed capacity (excluding IPP) of the Sabah Grid which supplies electricity for major towns from Federal Territory of Labuan to Tawau is 430.9 MW and the maximum demand is 760 MW (as of Jun 2010).

The East Coast Grid 132kV Transmission Line connecting the major towns in the East Coast has an installed capacity of 333.02MW and the maximum demand is 203.3MW.

The forecast demand growth of electricity is in a region of 7.7% per annum up to the year 2010 and the electricity demand is expected to reach 1,500 MW by the year 2020. To support the growing demand, various generation, transmission and distribution projects will be implemented.

A fully integrated grid connecting the West Coast Grid to the East Coast Grid was completed on 28 July 2007, and about 90% of the customers are now connected to this integrated grid.

Power generation plants
The summary of the list of power plants as follows:
 Number of Station: 37 (including 12 IPP excluding BELB stations)
 Power generated for FY 2010 up to July 2010: 1,279.6 GWh (SESB) & 3,075.8 GWh (IPP)

SESB-owned power stations

Major power stations

Installed capacity by plant type
 DG Diesel (Major) - 21%
 DG Diesel (Minor) - 26%
 DG Diesel (Rural) - 1%
 GT Diesel - 17%
 GT Gas - 18%
 Hydro - 12%
 Mini Hydro - 2%
 Steam Turbine - 3%

IPP-owned stations
 ARL Tenaga - 7%
 Biomass (TSH) - 2%
 Kadamaian, M. Hydro - <1%
 Kinabio - 2%
 Powertron - 28%
 Powertron II - 20%
 SBPC - 15%
 Seguntur - 2%
 Serudong Power - 5%
 SPC Energy - 5%
 Stratavest - 9%
 Sutra Harbour - 5%

Overall power generation capacity
 IPP - 70%
 SESB - Diesel - 11%
 SESB - Gas - 9%
 SESB - Hydro - 10%

Transmission lines
The interconnected system comprises West Coast Power grid and East Coast Power Grid. The transmission circuit length (in circuit-kilometres) as in December 2007:

Overhead lines

Underground cable

Submarine cable

Main intake substation

Power distribution
Distribution system capacity as in August 2009:

Electrical consumption
 Number of customers as in July 2010: 432,390 customers

See also
 National Grid, Malaysia
 Tenaga Nasional
 Sarawak Energy

References

External links

 Official site

Electric power companies of Malaysia
Sabah
Government-owned companies of Malaysia
Energy companies established in 1998
Non-renewable resource companies established in 1998
1998 establishments in Malaysia
Privately held companies of Malaysia